Alaska (also known as Sheasville) was an unincorporated town in Morgan and Owen counties, in the U.S. state of Indiana.

History
A post office was established at Alaska in 1868, and remained in operation until it was discontinued in 1904. The community was probably named in commemoration of the purchase of the Territory of Alaska.

References

Unincorporated communities in Morgan County, Indiana
Unincorporated communities in Owen County, Indiana
Unincorporated communities in Indiana